Frank B. Johnson (November 13, 1894 – February 5, 1949) was an American druggist and politician.

Born in Brainerd, Minnesota, Johnson served in the United States Army during World War I. Johnson went to the University of Minnesota and became a druggist. He served on the Brainerd City Council and was mayor of Brainerd. His grandfather was Parsons King Johnson. He served in the Minnesota House of Representatives from 1947 until his death. He died in Brainerd of a heart attack.

Notes

1894 births
1949 deaths
People from Brainerd, Minnesota
Military personnel from Minnesota
University of Minnesota alumni
Mayors of places in Minnesota
Minnesota city council members
Members of the Minnesota House of Representatives
20th-century American politicians
Pharmacists from Minnesota
United States Army personnel of World War I